Alexander Saeltzer (31 July 1814 Eisenach, Saxe-Weimar-Eisenach, Germany — 23 September 1883 New York City) was a German-American architect active in New York City in the 1850s and 1860s. His work includes the Anshe Chesed Synagogue (now the Angel Orensanz Center), Academy of Music (New York City), Theatre Francais (New York), the Duncan, Sherman & Company building and the South Wing of the Romanesque revival structure at 425 Lafayette Street built between 1853 and 1881 as the Astor Library (which later merged with the Tilden and Lenox collections to become the New York Public Library).

His father, Wilhelm Sältzer (1779–1853), was a brickyard-owner, an architect, a Grand Duke council of Saxe-Weimar-Eisenach, who also worked as the construction manager in the reconstruction of the Wartburg. Alexander Saeltzer was born in Eisenach, Germany. He studied at Berlin Bauakademie and was a pupil of Karl Friedrich Schinkel.  He moved to the U.S. from Berlin.

Synagogue
Saeltzer was engaged in February 1849 to design the synagogue at 172 Norfolk Street in an area of New York known as kleine Deutschland (Little Germany). The synagogue's Gothic Revival style was inspired by the Cologne Cathedral in Cologne, Germany, and Friedrichwerdesche Kirche in Berlin.  According to a 1987 report by the New York City Landmarks Preservation Commission, while Gothic architecture is closely associated with Christianity, it had also become popular with synagogues as Jewish congregations had taken over old church buildings and become accustomed to the style, and viewed it as just as appropriate as any other architectural style.

Debuted with celebration, the layout of the Ten Commandments and the use of stained glass in the synagogue later caused some controversy within the congregation.

Academy of Music
 
It was the demise of the Astor Opera House that spurred New York's elite to build a new opera house in what was then the more genteel neighborhood of Union Square. Efforts were led by Moses H. Grinnell, who formed a corporation in 1852 to fund the construction of the building. Shares were sold at $1,000 each to raise $200,000. It had a plush interior, and private boxes in the orchestra, but, perhaps due to newspaper editorials questioning the project's republican values, was consciously somewhat less "aristocratized" then the Astor Opera House had been – there, general admissions were relegated to the benches of a "cockloft" reachable only by a narrow stairway, and otherwise isolated from the gentry below, while in the new theatre many of the regular seats were relatively inexpensive.

The acoustics were lauded, but seating arrangement and vies came infor criticism.

Astor Library

Saeltzer won the competition to build the library designed the building in Rundbogenstil style, then the prevailing style for public building in Germany. Funding was provided by William B. Astor, son of the library's founder, John Jacob Astor. Astor funded two expansions of the building toward Astor Place by Griffith Thomas from 1856 to 1869 and Thomas Stent from 1879 to 1881. Both large expansions followed Saeltzer's original design making it difficult for an observer to detect that the edifice was built in three stages.

In 1920, the Hebrew Immigrant Aid Society purchased the building. By 1965 it was in disuse and faced demolition. The Public Theater, then the New York Shakespeare Festival, persuaded the city to purchase it for use as a theater. It was converted for theater use by Giorgio Cavaglieri between 1967 and 1976.

The building is a New York City Landmark, designated in 1965. It was one of the first buildings to be recognized as such by the newly formed Landmarks Preservation Commission of New York City, thanks to Joseph Papp's perseverance. In 2009, The Public began its “Going Public” campaign to raise funds for a major renovation of the historic building. Groundbreaking for the $35 million renovation occurred on March 9, 2010, with notables such as Liev Schreiber and Philip Seymour Hoffman in attendance. Plans include a renovation of Joe's Pub; the Pub went on a three-month hiatus during the summer of 2011 to allow for construction.

14th Street Theatre
The Fourteenth Street Theatre was a New York City theatre located at 107 West 14th Street just west of Sixth Avenue. as a home for French language dramas and opera.

It opened in 1866 as the Theatre Francais and was renamed the Lyceum in 1871. When J.H. Haverly took it over in 1879, he had renamed it Haverly's 14th Street Theatre.  By the mid-1880s, it had become simply the Fourteenth Street Theatre. By the mid-1910s it was being used as a movie theatre, until actress Eva Le Gallienne turned it into the Civic Repertory Theater in 1926.  She mounted a number of successful productions, but the Great Depression ended that venture in 1934. The building was demolished in 1938 or 1948.

Works
Saeltzer was contracted to design the syangogue in 1849. He later designed the Astor Library (now The Public Theater) (1851) and the Academy of Music on Astor Place in 1854. In 1866 he designed the Theatre Francais (New York).
Duncan, Sherman & Company building at 11 Pine Street on the corner of Nassau. Saeltzer used iron in the building and disguised it as stone using scagliola.

Bibliography
Treatise on Acoustics in connection with Ventilation (advertised in Limes Hydraulic Cement and Mortars by Q. A. Gillmore)

References

Further reading
The New Architect: Containing [architectural Designs] for Picturesque Dwellings, Villas, &c., [...]e Scenery, Plans, Details and Descriptions : [...] Critical Observations on Their Style and Character, Volume 1 Alexander Saeltzer, A. Sáeltzer, 1851
An Important, But Long-Forgotten, Architect by Jeff Richman on February 26, 2013 in Green-Wood Historian Blog (includes photo and burial plot information)

Architects from New York City
19th-century German architects
1814 births
1883 deaths